Heather Lynn Morgan is an American country music singer-songwriter from Richardson, Texas. After graduating from TCU, Heather signed her first publishing deal with Warner Chappell Music. Her songs have been featured on the TV show Nashville and recorded by Keith Urban, Brett Eldredge, Sara Evans, Eli Young Band, Maddie & Tae, and more. She is now a staff writer at Sony ATV Music, and had her first number 1 single in June 2014 with Brett Eldredge's "Beat of the Music". and was then awarded 2015 BMI Song of the Year. "Lose My Mind" was Heather's second number 1 single in October 2015. That year she was also nominated for Music Row's Breakthrough Songwriter of the Year Award, and took part as a songwriter in the 2015 ACM Lifting Lives Music Camp.

On 5 October 2018 she released her debut studio album Borrowed Heart produced by Paul Moak.

Discography 
 Borrowed Heart (2018)

Songwriter discography

References

American women country singers
American country singer-songwriters
Country musicians from Texas
Living people
People from Richardson, Texas
Singer-songwriters from Texas
Year of birth missing (living people)
21st-century American women singers
21st-century American singers